Graded absolutism is a theory of moral absolutism (in Christian ethics) which resolves the objection to absolutism (i.e., in moral conflicts, we are obligated to opposites).  Moral absolutism is the ethical view that certain actions are absolutely right or wrong regardless of other contexts such as their consequences or the intentions behind them.  Graded absolutism is moral absolutism but qualifies that a moral absolute, like "Do not kill," can be greater or lesser than another moral absolute, like "Do not lie". Although 'which' absolutes are in conflict depends on the context, the determination of which 'absolute' is greater is based on objective criteria rather than on the context, which distinguishes graded absolutism from situational ethics. For example, in Christianity, the greater absolute is judged by how 'much greater' it aligns with the Great Commandments. 

Also called contextual absolutism or the greater good view, it is an alternative to the third alternative view and the lesser evil view, both discussed below, regarding moral conflict resolution. It should not be confused with utilitarianism.

The third alternative view

The third alternative view is the view that there are never any real moral conflicts and that there is always a third alternative. For example, instead of answering in the affirmative or negative to the Nazi at the door, one may simply withhold an answer.

The lesser evil view

The lesser evil view is the view that the only way out of a moral conflict is to violate one of the moral absolutes and choose the lesser evil.  For example, if we disagree with Kant's thoughts on the categorical imperative and say that lying is a lesser evil than helping a would-be murderer, the lesser evil view would have us lie rather than help a would-be murderer.  According to the proponent of graded absolutism, this violates the ought implies can principle and defeats itself in obligating evil.

The greater good view

The greater good view is the view that there are real moral conflicts between absolutes, but rather than requiring a third alternative (as in the case of the third alternative view above) or obligating evil (as in the case of the lesser evil view above), this view obligates the greater absolute, or greater good.  For example, when one saves a life rather than telling the truth to a would-be murderer, one is committing the greater good of saving life, rather than violating the lesser good of telling the truth or committing the lesser (than aiding a murderer) evil of lying.  Since evil is the privation of good, only the privation of the greater good counts as evil, since whenever there is a moral conflict, we are only obligated to the greater good.

See also

 Moral absolutism
 Moral dilemma
 Moral universalism
 Prima facie right
 Situational ethics
 Value pluralism

References

Works cited
  Ethics: Knowing Right from Wrong, by Stan Reeves.
  Any Absolutes? Absolutely!, by Norman Geisler.
 Introduction to Philosophy:  A Christian Perspective, by Norman L. Geisler and Paul D. Feinberg, Baker Academic 2nd edition (May 1, 1987). .

Further reading
 Christian Ethics: Options and Issues by Norman L. Geisler; Baker Academic; 2nd edition (1989); .

Graded absolutism
Graded absolutism